Tenor for the Times is an album by saxophonist Ricky Ford which was recorded in 1981 and released on the Muse label.

Reception

The AllMusic review by Scott Yanow stated " Ford investigates seven of his diverse originals, really digging into the material. It's a good introduction to his talents".

Track listing
All compositions by Ricky Ford except where noted
 "This Our Love (Esse Nosso Amor)" – 7:30
 "Christmas Cheer" – 7:08
 "Hour Samba" – 7:29
 "Saxaceous Serenade" – 5:04
 "Portrait of Love" – 5:14
 "Orb" – 4:31
 "Arcadian Eclipse" – 5:14

Personnel
Ricky Ford - tenor saxophone
Jack Walrath – trumpet (track 2)
Albert Dailey – piano 
Rufus Reid – bass 
Jimmy Cobb – drums

References

Muse Records albums
Ricky Ford albums
1981 albums
Albums recorded at Van Gelder Studio
Albums produced by Bob Porter (record producer)